Nig-Latin is the debut studio album by American rapper Mistah F.A.B. from Oakland, California. It was released on October 1, 2002 via Straight Hits Entertainment.

Track listing

References

2002 debut albums
Mistah F.A.B. albums